Tabo may refer to:

Places
 Tabo (Nubia), an archaeological mound site in Nubia, Sudan
 Tabo, Himachal Pradesh, a small town in Himachal Pradesh, India
 Tabo Monastery
 Tabo, Mueang Phetchabun a sub-district of Mueang Phetchabun District in Phetchabun Province, Central Thailand
 Tabo Creek, Lafayette County, Missouri
 El Tabo, a commune in Valparaíso Region, Chile

Other uses
 Tabo (hygiene), traditional Filipino hygiene tool
 Tabo language or Waia, language of Papua New Guinea
 Willughbeia sarawacensis, a tropical fruit called tabo in the Philippines
 Christian Tabó (born 1993), Uruguayan footballer

See also 
 
 Thabo, given name
 Taboo (disambiguation)